Todd Ryan Riech is a former American olympian as a javelin thrower. Riech is a personal trainer and coach.

Early life 
On October 24, 1970, Riech was born in Hot Springs, Montana. Reich's father is Jack Reich. Reich's mother is Gloria Riech, who is part native American-Indian and French. Riech is a registered native American-Indian.

Education 
Riech earned a bachelor's degree from Fresno State University.

Career 
In 1994, as a college student, Reich won the NCAA Championship with a national collegiate record in the Javelin Throw.

As an athlete, Riech set his best at the Olympic trials with throw of 268 feet, 7 inches.

Riech participated at the 1996 Summer Olympics in Atlanta, Georgia. He set his personal best (82.12/269-5) with the new javelin type on July 2, 2000, in Glasgow. Todd made 4 USA teams.

Riech became an assistant track coach at CSU Long Beach, where he coached the Men's and Women's Javelin teams.

Riech became a certified personal trainer and coach. Riech is the co-founder and co-owner of ProSport Physical Therapy and Performance in California.

Personal life 
Reich's wife is Brittany Borman, a retired female javelin thrower from the United States. They have two children. Reich and his family live in Fresno, California.

International competitions

References

External links 

Living people
American male javelin throwers
Athletes (track and field) at the 1995 Pan American Games
Athletes (track and field) at the 1996 Summer Olympics
Olympic track and field athletes of the United States
Track and field athletes from Montana
American people of German descent
People from Fresno, California
People from Polson, Montana
Pan American Games medalists in athletics (track and field)
Pan American Games bronze medalists for the United States
Year of birth missing (living people)
Medalists at the 1995 Pan American Games